Konstantinos Michaelides (born 2 February 2000) is a Cypriot footballer defender who plays college soccer for the UCLA Bruins men's soccer team. He previously played for AEL Limassol.

Career

Collegiate 
Ahead of the 2019 NCAA Division I men's soccer season, Michaelides signed a National Letter of Intent to play collegiate association football for the University of California, Los Angeles (UCLA) in the United States. Michaelides made his college soccer and UCLA debut on August 30, 2019 against Northwestern University.

References

External links

Konstantinos Michaelides at UCLA Athletics

2000 births
Living people
Cypriot footballers
AEL Limassol players
Association football defenders
Cypriot expatriate footballers
Expatriate soccer players in the United States
Sportspeople from Limassol
UCLA Bruins men's soccer players